The Monetary Authority of Macao (AMCM) is the currency board and the de facto central bank of Macau. The regulatory institution was established on December 20, 1999, upon the transfer of sovereignty over Macau from Portugal to the People's Republic of China as the Macau Special Administrative Region.

History 

It was formerly known as the "Monetary and Foreign Exchange Authority of Macao" (AMCM), which was established on 1 July 1989.

According to Decree-law No. 14/96/M of 11 March, the Monetary Authority of Macao carries the following major statutory duties:

 To advise and assist the Chief Executive in formulating and applying monetary, financial, exchange rate and insurance policies;
 To guide, co-ordinate and oversee the monetary, financial, foreign exchange and insurance markets, ensure their smooth operation and supervise the actions of those operating within them according to the terms established in the regulatory statutes governing each respective area;
 To monitor internal monetary stability and the external solvency of the local currency, ensuring its full convertibility;
 To exercise the functions of a central monetary depository and manage the territory's currency reserves and other foreign assets;
 To monitor the stability of the financial system.

Offices
The head offices in order:
 6 Avenida da República 
 Avenida Sidónio Pais, which later housed the Macau Polytechnic Institute
 St. Raphael Hospital (built 1939), served as the head office from 1990-1999 - now  Consulate-General of the Portuguese Republic in Macao
 The head office at 45 Rua Pedro Nolasco da Silva opened on 26 September 1991. 
 Current: 24-26 Calçada do Gaio, São Lázaro (and the former Convent of the Precious Blood or Convento do Precioso Sangue) 1999–present - next to Escola Leng Nam

Chairman

 Anselmo Teng (丁連星)
Chan Sau San (陳守信)

See also
 Macanese pataca
 Economy of Macau
 Hong Kong Monetary Authority

References

External links
 

Macau
Economy of Macau
Government departments and agencies of Macau
Macau
1999 establishments in Macau
Organizations established in 1999
Regulation in China